Jennifer "Jen" Consalvo  is the COO and Co-Editor of Tech Cocktail.

Awards and recognition
Consalvo was recognized by The Washingtonian magazine as a 2011 "Washingtonian Tech Titan".

References

External References 

 
 
 
 
 
 

Living people
American University alumni
American women in business
Place of birth missing (living people)
Year of birth missing (living people)
American chief operating officers
21st-century American women